Ali Hayder Al Shamali (born 17 August 1983) is a Kuwaiti former footballer who played as a midfielder for the Kuwaiti Premier League club Al Qadsia.

References

External links
 

1983 births
Living people
Kuwaiti footballers
Qadsia SC players
Sportspeople from Kuwait City
Association football midfielders
Kuwait international footballers